R. Cole may refer to:

 R. Beverly Cole (1829–1901), American physician
 R. Guy Cole Jr. (born 1951), American judge